Xibornol is an antibiotic.

Overview
It is primarily administered to the throat.

Xibornol is a lipophilic drug mainly used in Italy and Spain in spray dosage forms for the local treatment of infection and inflammation of the throat. Its poor water solubility makes difficult the development of aqueous formulations of the drug, thus giving rise to a limited number of stable and pharmaceutically accepted preparations. In fact, xibornol is actually marketed only as spray aqueous suspension.

References

Antibiotics
Phenols